Waldemar de Oliveira (born 22 July 1951) is a Brazilian boxer. He competed in the men's light heavyweight event at the 1972 Summer Olympics.

References

External links
 

1951 births
Living people
Brazilian male boxers
Olympic boxers of Brazil
Boxers at the 1972 Summer Olympics
Boxers at the 1971 Pan American Games
Pan American Games medalists in boxing
Pan American Games silver medalists for Brazil
Sportspeople from Pernambuco
Light-heavyweight boxers
Medalists at the 1971 Pan American Games
20th-century Brazilian people
21st-century Brazilian people